Scrobipalpopsis madiae is a moth in the family Gelechiidae. It was described by Powell and Povolný in 2001. It is found in North America, where it has been recorded from California.

The length of the forewings is about 6.6 mm. The forewings are nearly unicolorous milky white, with some slightly greyish scales and two black stigmata, as well as a poorly defined, ochreous brown shade subtending the stigmata and in the subterminal area. There is also a series of five ill-defined, black submarginal dots
from the apex to the tornus. The hindwings are white.

The larvae feed on Madia species, possibly including Madia madioides.

References

Scrobipalpopsis
Moths described in 2001